Irina Konstantinovna Rodnina (born 12 September 1949) is a Russian politician and retired figure skater, who is the only pair skater to win 10 successive World Championships (1969–78) and three successive Olympic gold medals (1972, 1976, 1980). She was elected to the State Duma in the 2007 legislative election as a member of President Vladimir Putin's United Russia party. As a figure skater, she initially competed with Alexei Ulanov and later teamed up with Alexander Zaitsev. She is the first pair skater to win the Olympic title with two different partners, followed only by Artur Dmitriev.

Figure skating career
In her pre-school years, Irina Rodnina suffered from pneumonia eleven times; deciding to enroll her in an activity, in 1954 her parents brought her to her first skating rink, in the Pryamikov Children Park in Moscow. Since the sixth form of secondary school, age 13, she trained at Children and Youth Sports School of CSKA on Leningradsky Prospekt.

By 1963, Rodnina had begun skating with her first partner Oleg Vlasov, coached by Sonia and Milan Valun. In 1964, her coach became Stanislav Zhuk, who paired her with Alexei Ulanov. They won four consecutive World and European titles. Rodnina/Ulanov won their first World title in 1969, ahead of Tamara Moskvina/Alexei Mishin. They won their next two World titles, 1970 and 1971, ahead of silver medalists Lyudmila Smirnova/Andrei Suraikin. However, Ulanov fell in love with Smirnova, and prior to the 1972 Olympics, the couple made the decision to skate together the following season. Rodnina/Ulanov went on to compete at the 1972 Olympics where they captured the gold. They then prepared for their last competition together, the 1972 World Championships. While practicing together a day before the start of the competition, the pair had an accident on a lift and Rodnina ended up in hospital with a concussion and an intracranial hematoma. Despite the accident, they had a strong showing in the short program, receiving some 6.0s. In the long program, Rodnina became faint and dizzy but it was enough for their fourth World title. Ulanov continued his career with Smirnova, while Rodnina considered retirement.

In April 1972, her coach Stanislav Zhuk suggested she team up with the young Leningrad skater Alexander Zaitsev, who had good jumping technique and quickly learned the elements. Their music stopped during their short program at the 1973 World Championships, possibly due to a Czech worker acting in retaliation for the suppression of the Prague Spring. Known for intense concentration, they finished the program in silence, earning a standing ovation and a gold medal upon completion, ahead of Smirnova/Ulanov, whom they again defeated in 1974.

In 1974, Rodnina/Zaitsev left Zhuk, with whom the working relationship had become strained, to train with Tatiana Tarasova. They won six consecutive World titles together, as well as seven European gold medals, and won their first Olympic title together in 1976. Rodnina/Zaitsev did not compete during the 1978–79 season because she was pregnant with their son who was born on 23 February 1979. They returned in 1980 to capture their second Olympic title together and Rodnina's third. At the age of 30 years and 159 days, she became one of the oldest female figure skating Olympic champions. They then retired from competitive skating.

Throughout her career, Rodnina competed internationally for the Soviet Union and represented the Armed Forces sports society at the national level. With her partners, she won ten World Championships and three consecutive Olympic gold medals from 1971 to 1980, along with eleven European titles, making her the most successful pair skater in history. In the early 1990s, she coached at the Ice Castle International Training Center in Lake Arrowhead, California.

Doping
In a 1991 interview, Rodnina admitted that Soviet skaters used doping substances in preparation for the competitive season, stating: "Boys in pairs and singles used drugs, but this was only in August or September. This was done just in training, and everyone was tested (in the Soviet Union) before competitions."

Political career
Rodnina became a member of the Public Chamber of Russia in 2005. In the 2007 legislative election, she was elected to the State Duma as a member of President Vladimir Putin's United Russia party. On 17 December 2012, Rodnina supported the Dima Yakovlev Law, the law in the Russian Parliament banning adoption of Russian orphans by citizens of the United States.

In December 2022, the Ukrainian Parliament sanctioned Rodnina for her support of the 2022 Russian invasion of Ukraine. In 2023, she supported Poland's decision to boycott the Olympic Games in case Russian athletes are allowed to compete, saying that it would mean "Poland gets banned for the next two Olympic cycles".

Personal life
Rodnina graduated from the Central Institute of Physical Culture. Her first marriage was to Alexander Zaitsev, with whom she has a son of the same name, born in 1979. From her second marriage with the film producer Leonid Menkovsky, Rodnina has a daughter, Alyona Minkovski, born in 1986. She is currently divorced. She spent a number of years living in the United States and then moved back to Russia.

Twitter controversy
On 13 September 2013, Rodnina caused a stir when she tweeted a doctored photo of U.S. President Barack Obama and his wife Michelle, with Obama's mouth full of food, with a photoshopped banana in the image's foreground. She said she was practicing her right to free expression, but critics claimed she was making a racist comment about the African-American president. On 10 February 2014, Rodnina in her Twitter claimed that her account was hacked at the time of posting the offensive photograph and apologized for her handling of the affair.

Results

With Ulanov

With Zaitsev

Other honours and awards
Order of the Red Banner of Labour (1972)
Order of Lenin (1976)
Order of Merit for the Fatherland, 3rd and 4th classes
Medal "In Commemoration of the 850th Anniversary of Moscow"
Inducted into International Women's Sports Hall of Fame (1988)
Inducted into the World Figure Skating Hall of Fame (1989) 
International Skating Union's Jacques Favart Award
In the 2014 Winter Olympics in Sochi, Russia, she was given the honor of being the lighter of the Olympic Cauldron along with Vladislav Tretiak

References

Bibliography

External links

 
 
 
 Irina Rodnina in Encyclopædia Britannica
 Pairs on Ice: Rodnina and Ulanov 
 Pairs on Ice: Rodnina and Zaitsev 

1949 births
Living people
Figure skaters from Moscow
Figure skaters at the 1972 Winter Olympics
Figure skaters at the 1976 Winter Olympics
Figure skaters at the 1980 Winter Olympics
Olympic figure skaters of the Soviet Union
Olympic gold medalists for the Soviet Union
Soviet sportspeople in doping cases
Soviet female pair skaters
Russian female pair skaters
Armed Forces sports society athletes
Members of the Civic Chamber of the Russian Federation
Recipients of the Order "For Merit to the Fatherland", 3rd class
Recipients of the Order of the Red Banner of Labour
Recipients of the Order of Lenin
Olympic medalists in figure skating
World Figure Skating Championships medalists
European Figure Skating Championships medalists
Russian sportsperson-politicians
United Russia politicians
Olympic cauldron lighters
Medalists at the 1976 Winter Olympics
Medalists at the 1980 Winter Olympics
Medalists at the 1972 Winter Olympics
21st-century Russian politicians
Russian State University of Physical Education, Sport, Youth and Tourism alumni
Fifth convocation members of the State Duma (Russian Federation)
Sixth convocation members of the State Duma (Russian Federation)
Seventh convocation members of the State Duma (Russian Federation)
Eighth convocation members of the State Duma (Russian Federation)